Wehr is a town in the Waldshut district in Baden-Württemberg, Germany. It is situated 9 km north of Bad Säckingen, and 18 km east of Lörrach. Wehr is the home of two very old and large families: the Trefzgers and the Nagelins.

It is also home to the Weck Jar company.

Revolution of 1848 

In 1847, the movement to create a republic in Baden began to increase dramatically. The idea started in France based on the July Revolution in 1830 against Charles X. The government of Baden started, therefore, in 1848, a citizen patrol to calm this political movement down. Two of the leaders of the movement were Frans Joseph Trefzger and Hecker. The radicals declared a ‘German Republic’ on September 21, 1848. Many citizens, and finally the Prussian army troops, fought against the radicals. So did Wolfgang Trefzger, who belonged to the mayor's council. Frans Joseph Trefzger and his movement finally gave up in May, 1849. Some political activists immigrated to Switzerland and to America

References

External links 
 Wehr Web Page (in German)
 Wehr history, places of interest, destination (in German)

Waldshut (district)
Baden